John Crowley may refer to:

John Crowley (Irish revolutionary) (1891–1942), Irish revolutionary and hunger striker
John Crowley (author) (born 1942), American author
John Crowley (baseball) (1862–1896), American Major League catcher
John Crowley (biotech executive) (born 1967), American biotechnology executive
John Crowley (bishop) (born 1941), former bishop of Middlesbrough
John Crowley (director) (born 1969), Irish theatre and film director
John Crowley (politician) (1870–1934), Irish Sinn Féin politician
John Crowley (1659–1728), British politician
John Powers Crowley (1936–1989), U.S. federal judge
Johnny Crowley (born 1956), Irish hurler
Johnny Crowley (Gaelic footballer), Gaelic footballer with Kerry GAA
John Crowley, founder of Meadow Hall Ironworks, Barrow Road Wincobank